Marcus P. Chorney (born November 8, 1959) is a Canadian former professional ice hockey defenceman.

Playing career
Born in Fort William (now Thunder Bay), Ontario, Chorney played four successful seasons of college hockey at the University of North Dakota. He was named to the NCAA All-Tournament team in 1980, and two first All Star teams in 1981. He began his playing career with the Pittsburgh Penguins who drafted him in the sixth round of the 1979 NHL Entry Draft. Chorney was traded to the Los Angeles Kings for a  sixth round choice (Stuart Marston) in the 1985 NHL Entry Draft. After spending a season with the Kings, he was signed by the Washington Capitals but failed to earn a spot on the roster.

Personal life
His son Taylor Chorney is a defenceman who currently plays for HC Lugano in Switzerland. He has another son, Marcus Chorney, Jr,  who plays hockey for the Quinnipiac University Bobcats in the ECAC.

Awards and honors

Career statistics

References

External links

1959 births
Living people
Binghamton Whalers players
Canadian ice hockey defencemen
Erie Blades players
Ice hockey people from Ontario
Sportspeople from Thunder Bay
Los Angeles Kings players
North Dakota Fighting Hawks men's ice hockey players
Pittsburgh Penguins draft picks
Pittsburgh Penguins players
NCAA men's ice hockey national champions
AHCA Division I men's ice hockey All-Americans